The Woman in Room 13 is a lost 1920 American silent mystery drama film directed by Frank Lloyd and starring Pauline Frederick. It was produced and distributed by Goldwyn Pictures and is based on a Broadway play of the same name, The Woman in Room 13. The film was remade at Fox in 1932 as a talkie.

Plot
As described in a film magazine, Laura Bruce (Frederick) is divorced from her husband following an unpleasant matrimonial term. She then marries Paul Ramsey (Bowers), whom she has always loved. Dick Turner (McKim), his employer and enamored of Laura, sends her husband away on a business trip. A murder is committed and detective John Bruce (Clary) seeks to fasten the crime upon Paul. After he fails to do so, a happy ending results.

Cast
Pauline Frederick as Laura Bruce
Richard Tucker as Joe
Charles Clary as John Bruce
John Bowers as Paul Ramsey
Robert McKim as Dick Turner
Sidney Ainsworth as Andy Lewis
Charles Arling as Carrigan 
Marguerite Snow as Edna Crane
Emily Chichester as Harriet Marsh
Kate Lester as Lottie Hanson
Golda Madden as The Girl

References

External links

The AFI Catalog of Feature Films The Woman in Room 13

1920 films
American silent feature films
Lost American films
Lost mystery drama films
Goldwyn Pictures films
Films directed by Frank Lloyd
American films based on plays
1920s mystery drama films
American black-and-white films
American mystery drama films
1920 drama films
1920 lost films
1920s American films
Silent American drama films
Silent mystery drama films
Films with screenplays by Richard Schayer
1920s English-language films